Tetranitratoxycarbon, systematic name tetra(nitrato-O,O,O-methyl)methane (often shortened to tetrakis(nitratoxycarbon)methane), is a hypothetical molecule that was proposed by Clara Lazen, a fifth-grader in Kansas City, Missouri, who conceived of its structure and built a model in 2012. She is credited as co-author of a scientific paper on the molecule, which uses computational chemistry to predict that the molecule could actually exist.

Prediction 

Science teacher Kenneth Boehr was using ball-and-stick models to represent simple molecules during a  fifth-grade class, when ten-year-old Clara Lazen assembled a complex model and asked whether it was a real molecule. It is unclear if Lazen randomly or deliberately assembled this particular molecule.

Unsure if the molecule existed, Boehr sent a picture of the model to a chemist friend, Robert Zoellner at Humboldt State University. Zoellner checked the molecule against the Chemical Abstracts database and confirmed that Lazen's model was of a structural type that had not been reported before. 

Zoellner wrote a paper on the molecule, published in Computational and Theoretical Chemistry, crediting Lazen and Boehr as co-authors.

Properties
Tetranitratoxycarbon consists of oxygen, nitrogen, and carbon, with molecular structure . Its oxygen-rich formula, in particular, a positive oxygen balance, means it does not require any external oxidizer to undergo complete oxidation, and may thus have explosive or other high-energy properties. However, it is expected to be too thermally unstable for practical use.

The nitratoxycarbon functional group itself—a carbon atom and a nitrogen atom linked by three oxygen-atom bridges—has yet to be observed in any chemical compound. Computational chemistry studies indicate that it is only metastable, with other structural isomers such as the carboxylic nitroso-ester (C(=O)ONO) being more stable. As such this functional group is likely to remain purely hypothetical and no method for its synthesis has yet been proposed. However, several other elemental variations have been synthesized, including the all-carbon analog (bicyclo[1.1.1]pentane).

Possible reactions 
Several reactions of tetranitratoxycarbon have been investigated computationally. For example, one possible equation for its decomposition is:
C(CO3N)4 → 5 CO2 + O2 + 2 N2
that is predicted to have a standard enthalpy change of −1326 kJ/mol based on bond-energy calculation methods. Another potential reaction is its combustion in the presence of oxygen:
C(CO3N)4 + O2 → 5 CO2 + 2 NO2 + N2
that is predicted to have a standard enthalpy change of −1144 kJ/mol.

References

Further reading 

  

Nitrates
Hypothetical chemical compounds